Wei-Yin Chen (born July 21, 1985) is a Taiwanese professional baseball pitcher who is currently a free agent. He previously played in the Major League Baseball (MLB) for the Baltimore Orioles and Miami Marlins, and in the NPB for the Chunichi Dragons and Chiba Lotte Marines. Chen was the highest-paid baseball player of the 2020 MLB season at $22 million.

Early life
Wei-Yin Chen was born in Kaohsiung County, Taiwan. He attended Ciao-Tou Junior High School and Kaoyuan Vocational High School, which was also attended by former Major League  pitcher Tsao Chin-Hui and several other Chinese Professional Baseball League players.

Professional career

Chunichi Dragons

He was a pitcher for the Chunichi Dragons in Nippon Professional Baseball (NPB) from 2004 through 2011. Chen had Tommy John surgery at the end of 2006 season. His best season in Japan came in 2009 when he posted a 1.54 earned run average (ERA) to lead the league. When he came out of the Nippon League, FanGraphs described him as being an extreme control pitcher with poor velocity. A clause implemented into his contract with Chunichi allowed him to opt out after the 2011 season at age 26.

Baltimore Orioles

2012 season

After the 2011 season, Chen signed as an international free agent with the Baltimore Orioles. Chen was the first Taiwanese player ever signed by the Orioles. He made his MLB debut on April 10, 2012, against the New York Yankees in Baltimore. The game was broadcast live on national television in native Taiwan, and Chen totaled 5 innings and gave up two earned runs striking out six in a no-decision that the Orioles would later go on to lose in extra innings. In total, Chen finished the season leading the team with 32 starts during which he totaled 12 wins and 11 losses and posted an ERA of 4.02 in 192.2 innings pitched. In 2012, Chen was "the only constant in the (Orioles) rotation" and was consistent throughout the year.
Chen finished fourth in the AL for Rookie of the Year voting.

2013 season
Coming out of spring training, Chen won the number two spot in the Orioles' starting rotation behind Jason Hammel. Chen set a goal to throw 200 innings on the season. In his first three starts, he lacked run support and went 0–2 despite posting a 4.00 ERA. On May 15, 2013, the Orioles placed Chen on the disabled list, his first-ever stint there, with an injury to his right oblique. In his return from the disabled list on July 10, 2013, Chen pitched seven innings in a matchup against the Texas Rangers striking out four and allowing three hits, earning the win. Overall in 2013, Chen finished 7–7 with a 4.07 ERA in 23 starts. During the 2013 off-season, Chen underwent knee surgery to remove bone spurs.

2014 season
Chen pitched a season-high of eight strikeouts in a win against the Seattle Mariners on August 1, 2014. He dedicated the win to victims of the 2014 Kaohsiung gas explosions, which occurred hours earlier in his hometown. On September 10, Chen picked up his 15th win of the season against the Boston Red Sox and carried a perfect game into the sixth inning until Dan Butler's first major league hit. Chen finished the season with a 16–6 record and 3.54 ERA over  innings. In game 3 of the 2014 ALCS on October 14, Chen pitched  innings on 80 pitches and gave up 2 runs in a loss against the Kansas City Royals. Chen became the first Taiwanese pitcher to start an ALCS game.

2015 season

On June 26, 2015, Chen became the second Taiwanese-born player to have 100 career starts in the major leagues (after Chien-Ming Wang), allowing two runs and striking out five over six innings in a no decision against the Cleveland Indians. Despite only recording a 4–5 record at the break, Chen pitched to a 2.78 ERA and a 1.09 WHIP, along with 90 strikeouts in 110 innings over the first half of the season. Chen finished the season with an 11–8 record and a career-best 3.34 ERA over  innings pitched.

Miami Marlins

2016 season

On January 13, 2016, Chen agreed to a five-year contract worth US$80 million with the Miami Marlins. Chen was named the starting pitcher for the opening day of the 2016 season, becoming the second Taiwanese pitcher to make a start on opening day since Chien-Ming Wang in 2008. On January 25, 2017, Chen was announced as the cover athlete for the Taiwanese version of MLB The Show 17. In his first season as a Marlin, Chen went 5–5 in 22 starts after spending some time on the disabled list with an injury. He posted the worst ERA of his career, finishing at 4.96 in 123 innings.

2017 season
On April 8, Chen hit his first major league hit, an infield single off New York Mets' Starting Pitcher Zack Wheeler.
He was placed on the disabled list after 5 starts due to a partial UCL tear. He was activated off the disabled list on September 4 and would pitch out of the bullpen.

2018 season
Chen made his first start on April 28 vs. the Rockies after going almost a year without a big league start, getting the win, pitching  innings giving up just 1 run on 4 hits, 2 walks and 3 strikeouts.
On July 24, Chen hit his first major league double, off Atlanta Braves' Starting Pitcher Julio Teherán.

2019 season
Chen was designated for assignment on November 20, 2019. He was released and became a free agent on November 27.

Seattle Mariners

On January 30, 2020, Chen signed a minor league contract with the Seattle Mariners. Chen was released by the Mariners organization on June 25, 2020. Despite being released, Chen was the highest-paid baseball player of the 2020 MLB season at $22 million.

Chiba Lotte Marines
On September 22, 2020, Chen signed with the Chiba Lotte Marines of NPB. On December 2, 2020, he became a free agent.

Hanshin Tigers
On December 22, 2020, Chen signed with the Hanshin Tigers of NPB for the 2021 season. He was released on June 29, 2022.

International career
Chen played for the Chinese Taipei National Team in the 2004 and 2008 Olympic Games.

Scouting report
Chen is an "extreme flyball pitcher", at one point having an HR/9 innings of 1.3, way above MLB average. Chen pitches from a three-quarters arm slot and throws a four-seam fastball averaging 91–92 mph (tops out at 95–96 mph). In addition, he throws a two-seamer, a slider, a changeup, and an occasional curveball. Since he previously pitched in Japan where he started on five days rest rather than four, with the Orioles he initially had durability issues and was 0–4 in his last seven starts in 2012. Chen has been described as a legitimate middle-of-the-rotation starter. An opposing scout said, "I watched Wei-Yin Chen and swore I was watching Tom Glavine. He has such an effortless delivery and an above-average change up, and knows how to pitch inside."

Philanthropy
In 2012, Chen started a baseball scholarship program for Taiwanese students, contributing funds based on statistical milestones reached per season. He expanded the charity's efforts in 2015, to cover animal protection and children's welfare.

See also
 List of Major League Baseball players from Taiwan

References

External links

NPB career stats
 
 

1985 births
Living people
Baltimore Orioles players
Baseball players at the 2004 Summer Olympics
Baseball players at the 2008 Summer Olympics
Baseball players from Kaohsiung
Bowie Baysox players
Chiba Lotte Marines players
Chunichi Dragons players
Hanshin Tigers players
Miami Marlins players
Major League Baseball pitchers
Major League Baseball players from Taiwan
Nippon Professional Baseball pitchers
Olympic baseball players of Taiwan
Taiwanese expatriate baseball players in Japan
Taiwanese expatriate baseball players in the United States
Taiwanese people of Hoklo descent